Hey...Yehii To Haii Woh! is a Hindi series aired on Star One from 1 November 2004 to 2005. It is the story about twins who are separated at the time of birth.

Story
It is a story about the twins Raj and Sameer who are separated at the time of birth by their father, Babu Kamath, who deceives his wife Bhavna and sells one of his sons (Raj) to a multi-millionaire Jaydev Thapar, who is childless.  Due to an accident they switch places without knowing the existence of a twin brother. This is an adaptation of Amor descarado, the American version of the Chilean Amores de Mercado, created by Fernando Aragón and Arnaldo Madrid, and written by Alejandro Cabrera, Arnaldo Madrid, René Arcos, Marcelo Leonart and Larissa Contreras. It was a smash hit, with rating so far not outnumbered in Chile.  The American version was written by Delia Betancourt and Roberto Stopello.  Based on the American version there is a Greek version called Μια Στιγμή Δυο Ζωές, a Spanish version called Almas Gemelas (in which the twin brothers were turned into twin sisters), and an Indian version called Hey...Yehii To Haii Woh!. The Colombian Amores de Mercado is not at all related neither with the Chilean nor the American version.

Cast 
 Gaurav Chanana as Sameer Kamath / Raj Kamath
 Hemant Choudhary as Babu Kamath (Main Antagonist)
 Natasha Rana as Bhavna Babu Kamath
 Amrapali Gupta as Manju Kamath 
 Parineeta Borthakur as Puja
 Kanika Kohli as Simmi
 Aditi Pratap as Leena 
 Major Vikramjeet as Jaydev Thapar
 Meghna Malik as Antara Thapar
 Sonal Pendse as Neha
 Sandeep Rajora as Pran Thapar
 Kanika Maheshwari as Shahana
 Akshay Singh as Dasgupta
 Karishma Mehta as Dr. Varsha

References

Star One (Indian TV channel) original programming
Indian comedy television series
2004 Indian television series debuts
2005 Indian television series endings
Hindi-language television shows
Indian television series based on non-Indian television series